Västertorp is a Stockholm metro station located in the Västertorp suburb of Stockholm, Sweden. The station was opened on 5 April 1964 as part of the first stretch of the Red line, between T-Centralen and Fruängen. It is part of Line 14.

References

Red line (Stockholm metro) stations
Railway stations opened in 1964